Fare zone 5 is an outer zone of Transport for London's zonal fare system used for calculating the price of tickets for travel on the London Underground, London Overground, Docklands Light Railway and, since 2007, on National Rail services. The zone was created in May 1983 and in January 1991 part of it was split off to create Travelcard Zone 6.

List of stations

The following stations are within zone 5:

Changes
January 1991: zone 6 created from part of zone 5
January 2005: Cheam and Belmont from zone 6 to zone 5
January 2007: Stoneleigh from zone 6 to zone 5

See also

References